Cathrine Mary Burnett-Wake is a former Australian politician, who was a member of the Victorian Legislative Council for the Eastern Victoria Region representing the Liberal Party between December 2021 and November 2022. Burnett-Wake was appointed by a joint sitting of the Victorian Parliament on 2 December 2021 to fill a vacancy brought about by the resignation of Edward O'Donohue. She is the first Liberal female upper house member for Eastern Victoria.

Prior to entering the Victorian Parliament, Burnett-Wake was a local government councillor for Yarra Ranges Shire between October 2020 and November 2021, representing the Streeton Ward. She also worked as principal migration agent for Harris Wake, a legal and migration firm she co-founded with Owen Harris. Burnett-Wake sits on the boards of the Burrinja Cultural Centre and the Eastern Alliance for Greenhouse Action.

In July 2022, Burnett-Wake lost preselection to Renee Heath for the 2022 state election.

In February 2023 Burnett-Wake announced that she will run for Liberal preselection for the 2023 Aston by-election.

References

|-

Year of birth missing (living people)
Living people
Members of the Victorian Legislative Council
Women members of the Victorian Legislative Council
Liberal Party of Australia members of the Parliament of Victoria
Victoria (Australia) local councillors
Women local councillors in Australia
Victoria University, Melbourne alumni
21st-century Australian politicians
21st-century Australian women politicians